The 1999 Winchester Council election took place on 6 May 1999 to elect members of Winchester District Council in Hampshire, England. One third of the council was up for election and the Liberal Democrats stayed in overall control of the council.

After the election, the composition of the council was
Liberal Democrat 34
Conservative 12
Independent 5
Labour 4

Election result
The results saw the Liberal Democrats keep a majority on the council but lose 2 seats to the Conservatives.

Ward results

References

1999
1999 English local elections
1990s in Hampshire